Zapeando (possible English translation: Doing zapping, and self-called Zappeanding) is a Spanish television program produced by Globomedia which has been on air at the afternoons of laSexta since November 18, 2013. Created by Juan Andrés García "Bropi" and hosted by Frank Blanco (Dani Mateo since 2019), the program makes a humoristic review of other television programmes, plays games, prepares some sections...

The collaborators of the program are Ana Morgade, Anna Simon, Cristina Pedroche, Miki Nadal and Quique Peinado plus other occasional collaborators.

Format 
Zapeando is a live chat where its host and its collaborators talk about the most highlighted moments of the television, as well as the spaces more and less loved by viewers, the best videos and video edits, the mistakes of other hosts, remembering old people who had success on television or the most talked-about commercials. In addition, the format supports introducing guests to some programmes that help to chat about some TV moments (called momentazos, big moments) or simply talk about their most recent works.

History 
In late August 2013, it was announced that laSexta and Globomedia were preparing Zapeando, a live chat about television where a host and a group of collaborators would comment with humour all the actuality related to television, both nationally and internationally. On October 4 it was revealed that Frank Blanco would be his host, and a few days later his collaborators, which would be Celia Montalbán, César García, Mar Vega, Miki Nadal, Quique Peinado, Santi Villas, Sergi Mas and Susana Guasch.

Although its release was planned for November 11, Zapeando finally began to be broadcast on November 18, 2013 at 3.45 pm. Since then, it has been aired from Monday to Friday on the afternoons of laSexta. After some weeks of broadcast, the program began to incorporate innovations that gave a more fluent and better appearance to the program, such as the introduction of a script and adding a central table in which the presenter and the collaborators sit down. Some of them left the program (César García, Mar Vega, Santi Villas, Sergi Mas, Celia Montalbán and Susana Guasch) but new ones came, such as Sara Escudero, Ana Morgade, Cristina Pedroche and Manu Sánchez.

Little by little, more collaborators have joined the program, such as Anna Simon, Josie, Leo Harlem, Lorena Castell or Llum Barrera. Others left to dedicate themselves to other projects, such as Irene Junquera, Sara Escudero or Manu Sánchez. In addition, new collaborators are occasionally introduced during the summer to substitute the regular ones during this period.

The audience of the program has improved greatly since its beginning, with audience shares between 7% and 9% share and a number of viewers between 800 000 and one million on average. Its audience record was achieved in the program 500 (November 23, 2015), with an average of 1 200 000 viewers and an audience share of 9.4%. At the present, the network channel is satisfied with the positive audience evolution data, reaching more than 800 000 spectators and occasionally a million spectators.

Since September, 2019 the program is hosted by Dani Mateo.

Program team

Host

Current collaborators 
Here there is a list of the current collaborators, sorted by first appearance date.

 Regular collaborators
 Occasional collaborators
 Punctual collaborators (less frequent)
 Section-only collaborators

Seasons and programmes 

(*) Provisional data
(Bold) Most viewed season

Awards 
Zapeando and its team won the Gold Antenna award in 2015 and the Silver Antenna in 2017. They have also been nominated several times for the Neox Fan Awards and the Iris Awards.

References

External links 
  
 

Spanish television talk shows
LaSexta original programming
2013 Spanish television series debuts